Sosnovka is a rural locality (a selo) in Bobrovsky Selsoviet, Pervomaysky District, Altai Krai, Russia. The population was 645 as of 2013. There is 1 street.

Geography 
Sosnovka is located 47 km south of Novoaltaysk (the district's administrative centre) by road. Bobrovka is the nearest rural locality.

References 

Rural localities in Pervomaysky District, Altai Krai